Life Without Dick is a direct-to-video 2002 American black comedy film written and directed by Bix Skahill. The film focuses on the relationship that develops between an incompetent hitman and a woman who accidentally kills her boyfriend when she discovers he's leaving her for another woman.

Plot
Colleen Gibson doesn't realize live-in boyfriend Dick Rasmusson, a third-rate private detective, has been cheating on her until phony psychic Madame Hugonaut inadvertently provides accurate details about his most recent indiscretion. When Colleen confronts him with what she believes is an empty gun, she shoots and kills Dick, who had loaded the firearm without her knowledge.

Enter Daniel Gallagher, an Irish mobster whose desire to be a crooner was dampened by his ex-girlfriend Mary when she laughed at his singing. Daniel has managed not to kill anyone in his short career as a hit man, so when he discovers Colleen has killed Dick, who was next on his hit list, he's happy to take the credit and tell his boss and brother-in-law Jared O'Reilly that he finally completed an assignment. Unfortunately, Jared starts giving him a lot more assignments, and Daniel enlists Colleen to do his dirty work for him.

Complicating matters are Daniel's sister Ivy, who would like to see her husband dead; two bumbling detectives investigating Dick's murder; and the reappearance of Mary and her new boyfriend, mumbling Tony Moretti.

Cast
 Sarah Jessica Parker as Colleen Gibson
 Harry Connick, Jr. as Daniel Gallagher
 Johnny Knoxville as Dick Rasmusson
 Craig Ferguson as Jared O'Reilly
 Teri Garr as Madame Hugonaut
 Brigid Brannagh as Ivy Gallagher O'Reilly
 Claudia Schiffer as Mary
 Erik Palladino as Tony "The Turner" Moretti

External links

2002 direct-to-video films
2002 films
2002 black comedy films
2000s crime comedy films
American black comedy films
American crime comedy films
2002 directorial debut films
Films about contract killing
2000s English-language films
2000s American films